U.S.D. Matera is an Italian association football club located in Matera, Basilicata. Founded in 2021, it is the last of a very long list of city clubs.

History

F.C. Matera 

The history of Football Club Matera has covered 82 years of the football from the club based in Matera, Basilicata. It was a professional Italian football club, founded in 1930.  Due to financial problems in the past, the club have previously folded twice.

Matera Calcio 

After the bankruptcy of old Matera, Serie D club Irsinese Matera, based in Irsina, in the Province of Matera, relocated to Matera to become a spiritual successor, despite actual properties was yet to be acquired.

In the 2012–13 season, the first season back as a new franchise, Matera finished 3rd in Serie D/H  The following season, Matera won promotion to the new Lega Pro as Girone H champions.

In the 2018–19 Serie C season they were excluded from the league after failing to attend 4 consecutive matches.

USD Matera Calcio 2019 
The club was refounded in 2019 as U.S.D. Matera Calcio 2019 and resumed from Seconda Categoria. In 2021 it merged with Grumentum to reach the Eccellenza championship.

Colours and badge 
The club's traditional home kit is blue with a white diagonal strip whilst the away kit is white with a blue diagonal strip.

Stadium 
The club plays at the Stadio XXI Settembre-Franco Salerno, in Matera, which has a capacity of 7,490.

References 

 
Football clubs in Basilicata
Matera
Serie B clubs
Serie C clubs
Association football clubs established in 1933
1933 establishments in Italy